Belogorsky is a rural locality (a khutor) in Bishkainsky Selsoviet, Aurgazinsky District, Bashkortostan, Russia. The population was 6 as of 2010. There is 1 street.

Geography 
Belogorsky is located 4 km north of Tolbazy (the district's administrative centre) by road.

References 

Rural localities in Aurgazinsky District